In computer instruction set architectures (ISA), a repeat instruction is a machine language instruction which repeatedly executes another instruction a fixed number of times, or until some condition is met.

Since it is an instruction that operates on other instructions like the execute instruction, it has been classified as a meta-instruction.

Computer models

The Univac 1103 (1953) includes a repeat instruction which executes the following instruction a fixed number of times, possibly incrementing one or both of the address fields of that instruction. This compensates for the architecture's lack of index registers.

The GE-600/Honeywell 6000 series (1964) supports a single-instruction repeat, a double-instruction repeat, and a linked-list repeat.

The x86 ISA, starting with the 8086, includes a series of special-purpose repeat instructions which are called "repeat string operation prefixes" and may only be applied to a small number of string instructions. These instructions repeat an operation and decrement a counter until it is zero, or may also stop when a certain condition is met.

The Texas Instruments TMS320 digital signal processor (1983) includes an instruction for repeating a single-cycle instruction or two single-cycle instruction in parallel and an instruction for repeating a block of instructions. These use special block-repeat counter registers.

Semantics

The instruction or instruction pair to be executed follows the repeat instruction. Fields in the instruction determine the loop termination condition. In the case of the TMS320, a block of up to 64Kbytes can be repeated.

Notes

Central processing unit
Instruction processing
Instruction set architectures